Karlo Požgajčić (born 25 August 1982) is a Croatian figure skater. He is the 1999–2001 Croatian national champion.

External links 
 

1982 births
Living people
Croatian male single skaters
Place of birth missing (living people)